The Child Online Protection Act (COPA) was a law in the United States of America, passed in 1998 with the declared purpose of restricting access by minors to any material defined as harmful to such minors on the Internet. The law, however, never took effect, as three separate rounds of litigation led to a permanent injunction against the law in 2009.

The law was part of a series of efforts by US lawmakers legislating over Internet pornography. Parts of the earlier and much broader Communications Decency Act had been struck down as unconstitutional by the Supreme Court in 1997 (Reno v. ACLU); COPA was a direct response to that decision, narrowing the range of material covered. COPA only limits commercial speech and only affects providers based within the United States.

COPA required all commercial distributors of "material harmful to minors" to restrict their sites from access by minors. "Material harmful to minors" was defined as material that by "contemporary community standards" was judged to appeal to the "prurient interest" and that showed sexual acts or nudity (including female breasts). This is a much broader standard than obscenity.

Litigation history 

On February 1, 1999, Judge Lowell A. Reed Jr. of the Eastern District of Pennsylvania granted a preliminary injunction blocking COPA enforcement. In 1999, the United States Court of Appeals for the Third Circuit upheld the injunction and struck down the law, ruling that it was too broad in using "community standards" as part of the definition of harmful materials.

In May 2002, the Supreme Court reviewed this ruling in Ashcroft v. American Civil Liberties Union (2002), and found the given reason insufficient and returned the case to the Circuit Court. The law remained blocked there. On March 6, 2003, the 3rd Circuit Court again struck down the law as unconstitutional, this time finding that it would hinder protected speech among adults. The government again sought review in the Supreme Court.

On June 29, 2004, in Ashcroft v. American Civil Liberties Union (2004), the Supreme Court upheld the injunction on enforcement, ruling that the law was likely to be unconstitutional. Notably, the court mentioned that "filtering’s superiority to COPA is confirmed by the explicit findings of the Commission on Child Online Protection, which Congress created to evaluate the relative merits of different means of restricting minors' ability to gain access to harmful materials on the internet." The court also wrote that it was five years since the district court had considered the effectiveness of filtering software and that two less-restrictive laws had been passed since COPA. One law prohibits misleading domain names, and the other prohibits creating a child-safe .kids domain. Given the rapid pace of internet development, government officials thought these two laws might be sufficient to restrict access by minors to specific material.

Further proceedings
The Supreme Court remanded the case back to the district court for a trial, which began on October 25, 2006. In preparation for that trial, the Department of Justice issued subpoenas to various search engines to obtain Web addresses and records of searches as one part of a study undertaken by a witness in support of the law. The search engines turned over the requested information, except for Google, which challenged the subpoenas. The court limited the subpoena to a sample of URLs in Google's database, but declined to enforce the request for searches conducted by users; Google then complied.

On March 22, 2007, Judge Reed once again struck down COPA, finding the law facially in violation of the First and Fifth Amendments to the United States Constitution. In addition to the plaintiffs ACLU et al., several witnesses testified in defense of first amendment rights on the Internet, including the director of the Erotic Authors Association,  Marilyn Jaye Lewis. Reed issued an order permanently enjoining the government from enforcing COPA, commenting that "perhaps we do the minors of this country harm if First Amendment protections, which they will with age inherit fully, are chipped away in the name of their protection." The government again appealed, and the case was heard before the Third Circuit.

On July 22, 2008, the 3rd U.S. Circuit Court of Appeals upheld the 2007 decision.

On January 21, 2009, the United States Supreme Court refused to hear appeals of the lower court decision, effectively shutting down the law.

See also
Children's Online Privacy Protection Act
Child Protection Registry Acts
Communications Decency Act
Help:Sexual content
Internet pornography
List of legal topics
List of United States Supreme Court cases
List of United States Supreme Court cases, volume 542

Notes

External links
COPA Commission
[/ Child Online Protection Act, Truth in Domain Names Act, Federal TradeMark Dilution Act and U.S. Supreme Court Case 05-718]
Cybertelecom :: COPA



United States federal communications legislation
United States federal computing legislation
United States pornography law
Internet law in the United States
Child safety
Internet censorship in the United States